Michele Mosca is co-founder and deputy director of the Institute for Quantum Computing at the University of Waterloo, researcher and founding member of the Perimeter Institute for Theoretical Physics, and professor of mathematics in the department of Combinatorics & Optimization at the University of Waterloo. He has held a Tier 2 Canada Research Chair in Quantum Computation since January 2002, and has been a scholar for the Canadian Institute for Advanced Research since September 2003.  Mosca's principal research interests concern the design of quantum algorithms, but he is also known for his early work on NMR quantum computation together with Jonathan A. Jones.

Graduate and post-graduate education 
Mosca received a B.Math degree from the University of Waterloo in 1995.  In 1996 he received a Commonwealth Scholarship to attend Wolfson College, Oxford University, where he received his M.Sc. degree in mathematics and foundations of computer science.  On another scholarship (and while holding a fellowship), Mosca received his D.Phil degree on the topic of quantum computer algorithms, also at the University of Oxford.

Awards and honors
 2010 Canada's Top 40 under 40 from The Globe and Mail.
 Fellow of the Canadian Institute for Advanced Research program in Quantum Information since 2010. Scholar since 2003.
 2010 Waterloo Region 40 under 40: "Honouring those making a difference in our region".
 Invited Speaker, AAAS Science and Technology Workshop "Plug into Canada", organized by the Canadian Embassy, January 2005 (with National Science Advisor, the NSERC President, and 2 other Canadian researchers).
 One of fifteen PAGSE Symposium "Leaders of Tomorrow", Ottawa, Canada, 2004. The Partnership Group for Science and Engineering was formed in June 1995 at the invitation of the Academy of Science of the Royal Society of Canada to represent the Canadian science and engineering community to the Government of Canada.
 Invited article in inno'va-tion and inno'v@-tion2: Essays by Leading Canadian Researchers, a Canada Foundation for Innovation project "Showcasing some of the country's most cutting-edge researchers".
 Visiting Fellow at King's College, University of Cambridge, October 2005.
 Canada Research Chair, 2002–present.
 Premier's Research Excellence Award, Ontario, 2000-2005.
 Fellow of the Institute for Combinatorics and its Applications, 2000–present.
 Robin Gandy Junior Research Fellowship, Wolfson College, Oxford, 1998-1999.
 Communications and Electronic-Security Group Scholar, 1996-1999.
 Awarded Distinction for M.Sc., Oxford, 1996.
 UK Commonwealth Scholar, 1995-1996.
 Valedictorian and Alumni Gold Medal winner, Faculty of Mathematics, University of Waterloo, 1995.
 Bronze Medal (3rd in Canada), Descartes Mathematics Competition, 1990.

Select publications 

 An Introduction to Quantum Computing. (2007). Phillip Kaye, Raymond Laflamme, and Michele Mosca. New York City: Oxford University Press. 
 Algorithmica: Special Issue on Quantum Computation and Cryptography. (2002). Michele Mosca and Alain Tapp, Eds. Algorithmica 34 (4).

See also
 List of University of Waterloo people

References

External links
 Michele Mosca's homepage at the Institute for Quantum Computing

Year of birth missing (living people)
Living people
Academic staff of the University of Waterloo
University of Waterloo alumni
Combinatorialists
Information theorists
Modern cryptographers
Quantum physicists
Alumni of Wolfson College, Oxford
Canada Research Chairs
Quantum information scientists
Canadian physicists